Perumal (the 'Great One') is the name of a Hindu deity.

It was also a medieval Indian royal title of:
Western Ganga dynasty
Sripurusha
Rajamalla
Nitimarga
 Pandya dynasty
Maran Chatayan
 Chola dynasty
Parantaka
 Pallava dynasty
Paramesvara Varma II of Kanchi
 Chera Perumals of Makotai
Rama "Rajasekhara" (Cheraman Perumal Nayanar)
Sthanu Ravi (Kulasekhara Alvar)
Bhaskara Ravi "Manukuladitya"
Rama "Kulasekhara"

References 

Hindu dynasties
Indian surnames
Dynasties of India